Roseburg Forest Products, based in Springfield, Oregon, US is a privately owned wood–products company. Founded in 1936, the company had approximately 3,000 employees and revenues of nearly US$1 billion in 2012. Roseburg Forest Products operates mills throughout Western Oregon, and continues to be held by the founding Ford family.

History
The company was founded by Kenneth W. Ford in 1936 as Roseburg Lumber in Roseburg, Oregon. In the early 1980s it was renamed to Roseburg Forest Products.

In  2010, the company had about 3,000 employees and annual revenues of about $840 million. 

In 2012, revenues were about $991 million, and with approximately 3,000 employees making it the fifth largest private company in Oregon. 

In August 2014, Roseburg Forest Products received an investment from United Fund Advisors of $10 million.

See also 
 Hallie Ford

References

External links 
 
Reynaga v. Roseburg Forest Products

Forest products companies of the United States
Companies based in Oregon
Privately held companies based in Oregon
Roseburg, Oregon
Springfield, Oregon
Manufacturing companies established in 1936
1936 establishments in Oregon
Renewable resource companies established in 1936